Deer Creek is the name of some places in the U.S. state of Wisconsin:

Deer Creek, Outagamie County, Wisconsin, a town
Deer Creek, Taylor County, Wisconsin, a town